Demetrius (died 330 BC) was one of Alexander's somatophylakes. He was suspected of being engaged in the conspiracy of Philotas, and was executed. Ptolemy (son of Lagus) replaced him as Somatophylax.

References
 Arrian, Anabasis 3.27.5
 Quintus Curtius Rufus 6.7.15 and 6.11.35-38
Who's Who in the Age of Alexander the Great by Waldemar Heckel  (extract online)

330 BC deaths
Somatophylakes
Ancient Macedonian generals
Ancient Greek generals
Executed ancient Macedonian people
People executed by Alexander the Great
Year of birth unknown